was a Japanese samurai of the  Edo period.  He was an official in the Tokugawa shogunate and a favourite of the fifth shōgun, Tokugawa Tsunayoshi. His second concubine was Ogimachi Machiko, a writer and scholar from the noble court who wrote monogatari.

Career
The Yanagisawa house traced descent to the "Kai-Genji," the branch of the Minamoto clan which had been enfeoffed with the province of Kai in the eleventh century. 

Yoshiyasu served Tsunayoshi from an early age, becoming his Wakashū and eventually rose to the position of soba yōnin. He was the daimyō of the Kawagoe han, and later of the Kōfu han in Kai Province, a signature honour as it has been the fief held by Tsunayoshi before becoming shōgun, and of Ienobu, his heir apparent, as well as having an historic familial connection; he retired in 1709. Having previously been named Yasuakira, he received a kanji from the name of the shōgun, and came to call himself Yoshiyasu. He built Rikugien Garden, a traditional Japanese garden, in 1695. He had an adopted son named Yanagisawa Yoshisato by Tokugawa Tsunayoshi with Yoshiyasu's concubine, Sumeko.

Yanagisawa played a pivotal role in the matter of the forty-seven rōnin.

Cultural references
Yanagisawa is the subject the diary memoir of his concubine Ōgimachi Machiko (正親町町子, 1675 - 1724), Matsukage no nikki ('In the Shelter of the Pine'), which gives a detailed account of Yoshiyasu's glory during the period 1685-1709 modelled on the Eiga Monogatari and in a writing style inspired by The Tale of Genji. More than 36 hand-copied manuscripts survive to the present day. An English translation appeared in 2021.

Yanagisawa appears as a character in most of the novels by American mystery writer Laura Joh Rowland set in Genroku-era Japan as the antagonist to the books' main character Sano Ichiro. Rowland's chronology differs from history by having Yanagisawa exiled in disgrace in 1694 and being replaced by Sano as Tsunayoshi's chief advisor, only to return from exile later in the series. Other details of Yanagisawa's life, however, are portrayed fairly accurately, including his relationship to the shōgun.

See also
Samurai
Shudō

Notes

References
 Bodart-Bailey, Beatrice. (1980). Yanagisawa Yoshiyasu: a Reappraisal. Canberra: Australian National University. OCLC 222149819
 Nussbaum, Louis Frédéric and Käthe Roth. (2005). Japan Encyclopedia. Cambridge: Harvard University Press. ; OCLC 48943301

|-

1658 births
1714 deaths
Daimyo
Tairō
Japanese pages
Military engineers
17th-century LGBT people
Deified Japanese people